Saemapetch Fairtex (born September 10, 1994) is a Thai Muay Thai kickboxer who is currently signed to ONE Championship.

Titles and accomplishments

Awards
 ONE Championship
Performance of the Night (One time)

Muay Thai
 2012 Channel 7 Tiger Cement Tournament Champion
 2017 Thai Army Boxing -63 kg Champion
 2018 Muay Thai Grand Prix World Welterweight Champion

Fight record

|-  style="background:#cfc;"
| 2023-02-24 || Win ||align=left| Zhang Chenglong || ONE Fight Night 7 || Bangkok, Thailand || Decision (Unanimous) || 3  ||3:00
|- style="background:#cfc;"
| || Win ||align=left| Rittewada Petchyindee Academy || ONE 160 || Kallang, Singapore || KO (Left cross)|| 2 || 1:36
|-  style="background:#fbb;"
| 2022-01-14|| Loss ||align=left| Tawanchai P.K. Saenchaimuaythaigym || ONE: Heavy Hitters || Singapore || KO (Left Cross) || 1 || 2:55 
|-  style="background:#fbb;"
| 2021-11-12|| Loss ||align=left| Rittewada Petchyindee Academy || ONE Championship: NextGen II || Singapore || TKO (Doctor Stop./Left elbow) || 2 || 2:10
|-  style="background:#cfc;"
| 2021-04-28 || Win||align=left| Kulabdam Sor.Jor.Piek-U-Thai || ONE Championship: Full Blast || Singapore || KO (Straight to the body) || 1  ||2:12
|-  style="background:#cfc;"
| 2020-11-29 || Win||align=left| Pongsiri P.K.Saenchaimuaythaigym || Channel 7 Boxing Stadium || Bangkok, Thailand || KO (Left elbow) || 3  ||0:56
|-  style="background:#cfc;"
| 2020-08-14 || Win||align=left| Rodlek P.K. Saenchaimuaythaigym || ONE Championship: No Surrender 2 || Bangkok, Thailand || Decision (Majority) || 3  ||3:00
|-  style="background:#fbb;"
| 2019-11-22|| Loss ||align=left| Nong-O Gaiyanghadao || ONE Championship: Edge Of Greatness || Kallang, Singapore || KO (Right cross) || 4 ||1:46 
|-
! style=background:white colspan=9 |
|-  style="background:#cfc;"
| 2019-04-12 || Win||align=left| Ognjen Topic || ONE Championship: Roots of Honor || Pasay, Philippines || Decision (Majority) ||3  ||3:00
|-  style="background:#fbb;"
| 2019-03-02 || Loss||align=left| Tyler Hardcastle || Rebellion Muaythai 21 || Australia || Decision ||  5 ||3:00
|-  style="background:#cfc;"
|2018-11-23 || Win ||align=left| Alaverdi Ramazanov || ONE Championship: Conquest of Champions  || Pasay, Philippines || Decision (Unanimous) || 3 || 3:00
|-  style="background:#cfc;"
| 2018-08-18 || Win||align=left| Jordan Godtfredsen || Rebellion Muaythai 20 || Australia || Decision || 5 || 3:00
|-  style="background:#cfc;"
| 2018-07-07 || Win||align=left| Deividas Danyla || ONE Championship: Battle for the Heavens || Guangzhou, China || Decision (Unanimous) ||3  ||3:00
|-  style="background:#cfc;"
| 2018-05-05 || Win||align=left| Nauzet Trujillo || Enfusion || Spain || Decision (Split) ||  3 ||3:00
|-  style="background:#cfc;"
| 2018-04-07 || Win||align=left| Charlie Peters || MTGP Presents Lion Fight 41 || London, England || KO (Elbow) ||  4 ||1:30 
|-
! style=background:white colspan=9 |
|-  style="background:#cfc;"
| 2018-02-10 || Win||align=left| Navi J-Powerroofpuket || Lumpinee Stadium || Bangkok, Thailand || KO (Straight Left) ||  3 ||
|-  style="background:#fbb;"
| 2017-11-24 || Loss ||align=left| Singpayak Chombueng || Rebellion Muaythai 17 || Australia || Decision || 3 || 3:00
|-
! style=background:white colspan=9 |
|-  style="background:#cfc;"
| 2017-11-24 || Win||align=left| Apisit Ktgym || Rebellion Muaythai 17 – 65 kg Tournament Semi Final || Australia || Decision || 3 || 3:00

|-  style="background:#cfc;"
| 2017-11-24 || Win||align=left| Alexi Petroulias || Rebellion Muaythai 17 – 65 kg Tournament Quarter Final || Australia || Decision || 3 || 3:00

|-  style="background:#cfc;"
| 2017-09-30 || Win||align=left| Maycon Oller || All Star Fight 2 || Bangkok, Thailand || TKO || ||
|-  style="background:#cfc;"
| 2017-05-20 || Win||align=left| Jozef Janotik || Ministry of Fight || Slovakia || || ||
|-  style="background:#fbb;"
| 2017-04-30 || Loss ||align=left| Gu Hui || Kunlun Fight 60 || Guizhou, China || Decision || 3 || 3:00
|-  style="background:#cfc;"
| 2016-05-29 ||Win||align=left| Pinphet Sitjedaeng || Channel 7 Boxing Stadium || Bangkok, Thailand || Decision || 5 || 3:00
|-  style="background:#fbb;"
| 2016-04-24 ||Loss||align=left| Inseetong Por.Pinnapat  || Channel 7 Boxing Stadium || Bangkok, Thailand || Decision || 5 || 3:00
|-  style="background:#cfc;"
| 2015-08-24 ||Win||align=left| Rungkiat Eminent Air  ||  || Nakhon Si Thammarat, Thailand ||Decision || 5 || 3:00
|-  style="background:#fbb;"
| 2015-07-26 ||Loss||align=left| Starboy Petchkiatchpetch || Channel 7 Boxing Stadium || Bangkok, Thailand || Decision || 5 || 3:00
|-  style="background:#cfc;"
| 2015-07-04 ||Win||align=left|  Chalamtong Sitpanon ||  || Lampang, Thailand || Decision || 5 || 3:00
|-  style="background:#cfc;"
| 2015-05-24 ||Win||align=left|  Patakthep Sinbeemuaythai || Channel 7 Boxing Stadium || Bangkok, Thailand || Decision || 5 || 3:00
|-  style="background:#cfc;"
| 2015-04-28 ||Win ||align=left| Nawaphol Sitthiphon  ||  || Roi Et, Thailand ||KO (Low Kicks) || 4 ||
|-  style="background:#fbb;"
| 2014-11-30 ||Loss||align=left| Rungkiat Eminent Air  || Channel 7 Boxing Stadium || Bangkok, Thailand || Decision || 5 || 3:00
|-  style="background:#fbb;"
| 2014-08-10|| Loss||align=left| Rodlek P.K. Saenchaimuaythaigym || Channel 7 Boxing Stadium || Bangkok, Thailand || Decision || 5 || 3:00
|-  style="background:#fbb;"
| 2014-05-11 ||Loss||align=left|  Chalamtong Sitpanon || Channel 7 Boxing Stadium || Bangkok, Thailand || KO (Left Hook)|| 2 ||
|-  style="background:#cfc;"
| 2014-02-01|| Win||align=left| Yodbuangam Sor.Chokkitchai || Channel 7 Boxing Stadium || Bangkok, Thailand || Decision || 5 || 3:00
|-  style="background:#fbb;"
| 2013-09-15 || Loss ||align=left| Nawaphol Sitthiphon  || Channel 7 Boxing Stadium || Bangkok, Thailand || Decision || 5 || 3:00
|-  style="background:#fbb;"
| 2013-07-14 || Loss ||align=left| Padsenlek Rachanon  || Channel 7 Boxing Stadium || Bangkok, Thailand || Decision || 5 || 3:00
|-  style="background:#cfc;"
| 2013-04-07 || Win||align=left| Khunsap Suwitgym || Channel 7 Boxing Stadium || Bangkok, Thailand || Decision || 5 || 3:00
|-  style="background:#fbb;"
| 2013-01-06 || Loss||align=left| Chennarong Tor.Thaksin || Channel 7 Boxing Stadium || Bangkok, Thailand || Decision || 5 || 3:00
|-  style="background:#fbb;"
| 2012-10-21 || Loss ||align=left| Rungsiangtawan Sitnayoksirichai  ||  Channel 7 Boxing Stadium || Bangkok, Thailand || Decision || 5 || 3:00
|-  style="background:#cfc;"
| 2012-06-17 ||Win ||align=left| Mafeuangnoi Chor Rongsoorang  || Channel 7 Boxing Stadium || Bangkok, Thailand || Decision || 5 || 3:00
|-
! style=background:white colspan=9 |
|-  style="background:#cfc;"
| 2011-11-13 || Win ||align=left| Ritichai Sor Sakoncheua  || Channel 7 Boxing Stadium || Bangkok, Thailand || Decision || 5 || 3:00
|-
| colspan=9 | Legend:

References

External links
 Saemapetch Fairtex at ONE Championship

Living people
Saemapetch Fairtex
1994 births
Kunlun Fight kickboxers
ONE Championship kickboxers
Saemapetch Fairtex